Sjölin is a surname of Swedish origin and may refer to:

 Åke Sjölin (1910–1999), Swedish diplomat
 Daniel Sjölin (born 1977), Swedish novelist and television presenter
 Gunnar Sjölin (1924–2015), Swedish speed skater
 Hilda Sjölin (1835–1915), Swedish photographer
 Ivar Sjölin (1918–1992), Swedish freestyle wrestler
 Stig Sjölin (1928–1995), Swedish middleweight boxer

References

See also 
 Sjödin

Swedish-language surnames